Juicy Fruit is a 1983 album by R&B group Mtume. It contains their No. 1 R&B hit, "Juicy Fruit". It was their third album for Epic Records.

Track listing
"Green Light" (Dean Cannon, James Mtume, Philip Field)
"Juicy Fruit" (Mtume)
"Hips" (Dean Cannon, Philip Field)
"Would You Like To (Fool Around)" (Mtume, Reggie Lucas)
"Your Love's Too Good (To Spread Around)" (Leon "Ndugu" Chancler, Norman Dozier, Reggie Andrews)
"Hip Dip Skippedabeat" (Darlene Davis, David Foreman, Mtume)
"Ready for Your Love" (Ronald Sirois, Philip Field)
"The After 6 Mix (Juicy Fruit Part II)" (Mtume)

Personnel
Mtume
James Mtume – keyboards, lead vocals, backing vocals
Tawatha Agee – lead vocals, backing vocals, percussion
Ed "Tree" Moore, Kevin Robinson, Michael Murphy – guitar
Raymond Jackson – bass, backing vocals
Philip Field - keyboards, synthesizers, synth programming, backing vocals
Barry Eastman, Bernie Worrell, David Frank – keyboards
Gary Bartz – saxophone
Technical
Andy Wallace – engineer
Steve Kahn – engineer

Charts

Singles

"Juicy Fruit"
The song "Juicy Fruit" is a staple hip-hop sample.  It is sampled in the following songs:

 "Juicy" by Wrecks-N-Effect
 "Juicy" by Next
 "Do You See" by Warren G
 "This D.J." by Warren G
 "Loving You" by Jennifer Lopez
 "Faithfully" by Faith Evans
 "Juicy" by The Notorious B.I.G.
 "Let It Go" by Keyshia Cole
 "I Don't Care (Juiciest)"/"How Come You Don't Call Me Part 2" by Alicia Keys
 "The Ave" By Dre Dog
"Game's Pain" Mega Remix by The Game Featuring Fat Joe, Jadakiss, Keyshia Cole, Queen Latifah, Bun B, Pusha T, and Young Buck
 "Dreaming Casually" by Rocky Padilla
 "East Side Love Story" by Johnny Boy
 "You Make It Easy" By Sharissa (Unreleased)
 "On the Blvd." by Lil Puppet
 "Joystick" by 213, and Snoop Dogg
 "Supastar" by Montell Jordan
 "No Soul" by Say Anything
 "No Question" by Allure ft. LL Cool J
 "Freak Tonight" by R. Kelly
 "The One" by Tamar Braxton
 "Leather and Wood" by AMG
 "Flashbacks" by The Warlocks
 "Your Love (Urban Noize Remix)" by Nicki Minaj

References

External links
 Mtume-Juicy Fruit at Discogs

Mtume albums
1983 albums
Epic Records albums